The Lebanon national rugby league team played their first competitive match in 1998. The following list is a complete collection of results for the Lebanon national rugby league team.

1990s

2000s

2010s

2020s

See also

Lebanon national rugby league team
Lebanese Rugby League Federation
Rugby league in Lebanon

References

External links

Rugby league in Lebanon
Rugby league-related lists
Lebanon national rugby league team